The CFL on TSN is TSN's presentation of the Canadian Football League. The Sports Network (TSN) has broadcast CFL games since the 1987 season and has been the exclusive broadcaster of all CFL games (including the playoffs and Grey Cup) since 2008.  While the CFL on TSN shows all CFL games, a more entertainment-focused Thursday Night Football telecast (unrelated to the National Football League package of the same name) was added in 2015.

Commentators

Studio panel
The CFL on TSNs studio panel consists of host Kate Beirness and a rotating crew of former CFL all-star players Matt Dunigan, Milt Stegall, Henry Burris, and former CFL coach Mike Benevides.  Former CFL on CBC studio host Brian Williams occasionally contributed to the studio show also.

Beirness took over studio host duties from Rod Smith in 2021.

Matt Dunigan returned to the CFL on TSN studio show after spending the 2004 season on the sidelines as the general manager and head coach of the Calgary Stampeders. Dunigan's in-depth knowledge, outgoing personality and passion for the game have made him a fan favourite with viewers.

Milt Stegall joined TSN as a guest analyst in 2009 after a 14-year playing career in the CFL.

Henry Burris joined TSN early in the 2017 season as a guest off-screen analyst narrating short explainer films of standard CFL plays using file footage, then joined the studio panel full-time late in 2017. The record-setting retired quarterback was named the league's Most Outstanding Player twice (2010, 2015), won the Grey Cup three times (1998, 2008, 2016), and was named the Grey Cup MVP twice (2008, 2016) during his 19-year CFL career. Burris works as a television host for the local Ottawa version of CTV Morning Live.

Davis Sanchez joined the CFL panel in 2018 after a stint with CKGM sports radio in Montreal commenting on Alouettes games. The 3-time Grey Cup-winning cornerback (2005, 2009, 2011) and three-time East Division defensive All-Star (2000, 2004, 2008) spent 10 seasons in the CFL and 2 in the NFL.

Mike Benevides rejoined the CFL panel in 2019 after being let go from his last coaching role with the Edmonton Eskimos. Benevides was part of the coaching staff of 3 Grey Cup winning teams (2001, 2006, 2011), and was previously a CFL commentator on TSN during the 2015 season.

Game commentators
Veteran sportscaster Chris Cuthbert was the primary voice of the CFL on TSN from 2005 to 2020. He had joined the network in 2005 after leaving the CBC. He was paired with longtime colour commentator Glen Suitor. Cuthbert later left TSN and joined Rogers Sportsnet in June 2020; Rod Black succeeded him as lead play-by-play but left in October 2021. Sara Orlesky was the lead sideline reporter for Friday Night Football from 2008. Orlesky left TSN late into the 2022 season. The secondary commentating team is Rod Smith and Duane Forde. Dustin Nielson and Matt Dunigan work as the third team, when needed.

International broadcasts
ESPN3, the online arm of ESPN Inc., carried most CFL games from 2008 through 2017; beginning in 2018, live broadcasts moved behind a paywall to ESPN+, ESPN's subscription over-the-top service, with ESPN3 continuing to offer replays of games originally carried on one of ESPN's linear networks.

As part of the 2013 contract extension, which included both U.S. and Canadian broadcast rights, ESPN's terrestrial networks (particularly ESPN2) have carried TSN's coverage of select CFL games on U.S. television. Since 2017, the broadcast schedule began on opening weekend, when most (if not all) of the 4 games would be aired on traditional cable. After that, about one game (usually on a Thursday or Friday Night) every week would also air on cable, though ESPN has not arranged a specific/consistent timeslot for when that game would occur. This lasts throughout the summer, up until the start of the NCAA College Football season in late August/early September, when nearly all of the games move exclusively to ESPN+. This lasts until the start of the playoffs, when the broadcasts are back on cable (playoff games are divided between ESPN2 and ESPNnews, and the Grey Cup is consistently held on ESPN2, which it has been every year since 2014). In total, around 20 games are carried throughout the season on the ESPN networks, with the other 65 airing on ESPN+.

The TSN deal also allows for CFL games to be simulcast on ESPN's other international networks, as well as through BT Sport, ESPN's licensing partner in the British Isles.

Prior agreements
In the early 1990s, Prime Network simulcast TSN's coverage.

In 2008, Friday night games were shown on the World Sport channel of Voom HD.  However, in January 2009, Cablevision shut down Voom HD.  America One held the rights to other TSN and (prior to 2008) CBC simulcasts through the 2009 season; America One syndicated its games to various regional sports networks across the United States. After that agreement ended, the CFL secured one-year limited broadcast deals with NFL Network (2010–11) and NBC Sports Network (2012–13).

References 

The Sports Network original programming
Canadian Football League on television
1990 Canadian television series debuts
1980s Canadian sports television series
1990s Canadian sports television series
2000s Canadian sports television series
2010s Canadian sports television series